The mixed doubles at the 2022 South East Asian Table Tennis Championships in Bangkok, Thailand was held at Fashion Island Hall 3rd from 25 to 27 June 2022.

Schedule 
All times are Thailand Standard Time (UTC+07:00)

Main bracket

Top Draw
Source:

Bottom Draw

Final bracket 
Source:

References 

South East Asian Table Tennis Championships